The Alliance of Liberals and Democrats for Europe in the Parliamentary Assembly of the Council of Europe (ALDE-PACE) (French: Alliance des démocrates et des libéraux pour l'Europe) is a political group in the Parliamentary Assembly of the Council of Europe bringing together 92 members from 26 states. Since January 2020, the group is chaired by Jacques Maire of France.

ALDE-PACE Mission 
The Mission of the ALDE-PACE group is to promote core values of the Council of Europe: democracy, human rights and the rule of law through enhanced political actions inside and outside the Parliamentary Assembly of the Council of Europe. ALDE adopted a new mission statement 22 January 2018 outlining the values and objectives of the group. ALDE members realize these objectives by actively participating in the Parliamentary Assembly sessions, working in its Committees, drafting reports, initiating debates and ensuring the follow-up of this work in their home countries. Outside the Assembly the group members are committed to promoting the principles of the Council of Europe and giving support to liberal and democratic values throughout Europe.

Composition

Bureau 
According to the Rules of Procedure of the ALDE-PACE (as amended on 22 January 2018), the Bureau of the Group consists of the Chairperson, 11 Vice-Chairpersons and the Treasurer of the Group. Chairpersons of committees and former Chairpersons of the Group are ex officio members of the Bureau.

Members 
List of ALDE-PACE members

Secretariat
The permanent secretariat of the Group is located in the headquarters of the Council of Europe in Strasbourg, France (Palais de l’Europe). The secretariat is chaired by Dr Maria Bigday.

History 
It was not until after the celebration of the Council of Europe's 25th anniversary in 1964 that the Rules of Procedure of the Consultative Assembly (its name was not changed to Parliamentary Assembly until 1974) discreetly mentioned that members had the possibility of forming political groups. The history of the liberal group in the PACE dates back to the early 1970s (first documented in 1974). At the time it was called the Liberal Group and consisted of 30 members headed by Frederik Portheine (Netherlands).

In the mid-80s the group changed its name to the "Liberal, Democratic and Reformers' Group" (LDR) in order to make the Group's political ideals universally and unequivocally recognisable. The name "Alliance of Liberals and Democrats for Europe" (ALDE) was adopted on 20 June 2005 in order to enhance cooperation with other European liberal and democratic bodies, in particular the ALDE of the European Parliament.

ALDE-PACE Presidents

Liberal Presidents of the Parliamentary Assembly

Liberal Secretary General of the Council of Europe 
Daniel Tarschys (Sweden) was Secretary General of the Council of Europe from 1994 - 1999.

History of the Secretariat 
The permanent secretariat of the Group operates since 1978, when Mr Peter Kallenberger was appointed Secretary of the Group. After he retired in 2010, Ms Maria Bigday took up the position of the Secretary.

Activities

Recent reports prepared by the ALDE members 

Anne Brasseur
 Good Football governance (Report, Doc 14452, 15 December 2017)
Internet and politics: the impact of new information technology on democracy (Report, Doc 13386, 13 January 2014)
Rik Daems
Setting minimum standards for electoral systems in order to offer the basis for free and fair elections (Report,Doc 15027, 8 January 2020)
Extra-institutional actors in the democratic system (Report, Doc 12278, 4 June 2010)
Dick Marty
Inhuman treatment of people and illicit trafficking in human organs in Kosovo ( Report, Doc. 12462, 25 January 2011)
Alleged secret detentions and unlawful inter-state transfers of detainees involving Council of Europe member states (Report, Doc 10957, 12 June 2006)

Conferences and side-events 
The ALDE-PACE Group regularly holds conferences, hearings, seminars and round tables in the framework of the Council of Europe scope of interest. It also co-organises joint events with other European and international liberal and democratic institutions. Information relating to these side events is found on the ALDE-PACE Pace website and in the ALDE newsletter published after each session.

Partner organisations 
The ALDE-PACE holds stable partnership with major European and world liberal and democratic organisations.
 ALDE Party
 Renew Europe in the European Parliament
 International Federation of Liberal Youth (IFLRY)
 Liberal International (LI)
 Renew Europe in the European Committee of the Regions
 Independent Liberal and Democratic Group in the Congress of Local and Regional Authorities of the Council of Europe

References

External links 

 

Alliance of Liberals and Democrats for Europe
Political groups in the Parliamentary Assembly of the Council of Europe